Aßling (Oberbay) station is a railway station in the municipality of Aßling, located in the Ebersberg district of Bavaria, Germany.

References

Railway stations in Bavaria
Buildings and structures in Ebersberg (district)
Railway stations in Germany opened in 1871
1871 establishments in Bavaria